,  originally named Rendsburg, was a cargo ship built in Germany in 1925. It was sunk by an American submarine on February 25, 1944, while in the service of the Imperial Steamship Co., a Japanese government-owned company. The sinking cost about 3,000 passengers and crew their lives.

History
The 6,200 ton cargo ship was built for the Deutsche Australische Dampfschiffs Gesellschaft (German-Australian Line) of Hamburg at the Vulcan-Werke, in Hamburg, Germany. She was launched in 1925 and named Rendsburg. On May 10, 1940 she was confiscated by the Dutch in the Netherlands East Indies and renamed Toendjoek. She was scuttled on March 2, 1942 as a blockship off the port of Trandjung Priok. Refloated by the IJN on August 12, 1942, she was repaired and put into service with the Imperial Steamship Co, a Japanese government company.

On February 25, 1944, crammed with 3,500 Javanese labourers (rōmusha) and hundreds of Allied POWs, Tango Maru was traveling between Java and Ambon. The American submarine USS Rasher sank the ship 25 miles north of Bali Island with three torpedo hits. Only about 500 Javanese survived. On the same day USS Rasher also sank Ryusei Maru, killing some 5,000 Japanese soldiers.

Another Japanese ship named Tango Maru, a 2,046 ton tanker, was also sunk by Rasher, on November 8, 1943 in the Makassar Strait.

See also
 List by death toll of ships sunk by submarines
 Imperial Japanese Army Railways and Shipping Section
 Foreign commerce and shipping of Empire of Japan

References

1925 ships
Ships built in Hamburg
Scuttled vessels
Captured ships
Maritime incidents in February 1944
Ships sunk by American submarines
Maritime incidents in March 1942
World War II shipwrecks in the Pacific Ocean